Schola Cantorum de Paris is a musical academy based in France.

Schola Cantorum may also refer to:
 Schola Cantorum, a choir formerly known as MacDowell Chorus and based in the United States
 Schola Cantorum (Italian vocal group), a vocal group based in Italy
 Schola Cantorum (Norwegian choir), a chamber choir based in Norway
 Schola Cantorum Basiliensis, a musical academy based in Switzerland
 Schola Cantorum de Venezuela, a choir based in Venezuela
 Schola Cantorum of Oxford, a chamber choir based at Oxford University in England
 The Schola Cantorum of Rome, a Catholic choir based in Italy
 University of Arkansas Schola Cantorum, a choir based at the University of Arkansas in the United States
 Schola Cantorum Stuttgart, Stuttgart, Germany